Bob Brown (9 May 1930 in Sydney - 23 July 1960 at Solituderennen) was an Australian professional Grand Prix motorcycle road racer. His best season was in 1959 when he finished in third place in both the 350cc and 500cc world championships. Brown was killed during practice for the 1960 West German Grand Prix.

References 

1930 births
1960 deaths
Sportsmen from New South Wales
Motorcycle racers from Sydney
Australian motorcycle racers
125cc World Championship riders
250cc World Championship riders
350cc World Championship riders
500cc World Championship riders
Isle of Man TT riders
Motorcycle racers who died while racing
Sport deaths in Germany